Walker Mill is an unincorporated area and census-designated place (CDP) in Prince George's County, Maryland, United States. Per the 2020 census, the population was 12,187.

Geography

Demographics

2020 census

Note: the US Census treats Hispanic/Latino as an ethnic category. This table excludes Latinos from the racial categories and assigns them to a separate category. Hispanics/Latinos can be of any race.

2000 Census
As of the census of 2000, there were 11,104 people, 3,976 households, and 2,985 families residing in the CDP. The racial makeup of the CDP was 2.47% White, 94.99% African American, 0.37% Native American, 0.26% Asian, 0.01% Pacific Islander, 0.23% from other races, and 1.68% from two or more races. Hispanic or Latino of any race were 0.90% of the population.

There were 3,976 households, out of which 37.9% had children under the age of 18 living with them, 34.4% were married couples living together, 34.7% had a female householder with no husband present, and 24.9% were non-families. 20.7% of all households were made up of individuals, and 3.4% had someone living alone who was 65 years of age or older. The average household size was 2.78 and the average family size was 3.18.

In the CDP, the population was spread out, with 30.9% under the age of 18, 9.0% from 18 to 24, 29.6% from 25 to 44, 23.2% from 45 to 64, and 7.3% who were 65 years of age or older. The median age was 32 years. For every 100 females, there were 80.3 males. For every 100 females age 18 and over, there were 70.5 males.

The median income for a household in the CDP was $49,276, and the median income for a family was $51,052. Males had a median income of $35,473 versus $31,281 for females. The per capita income for the CDP was $19,340. About 8.8% of families and 11.5% of the population were below the poverty line, including 16.7% of those under age 18 and 8.3% of those age 65 or over.

Education

Walker Mill is a part of the Prince George's County Public Schools system.

Zoned elementary schools for the CDP are John Bayne, Doswell Brooks, Concord, and District Heights. Walker Mill Middle School serves most of Walker Mill CDP while Drew-Freeman Middle serves a section. Much of the CDP is zoned to Central High School while a portion is zoned to Suitland High School.

Thomas Claggett Elementary School was previously in Walker Mill CDP. Its official capacity was 464. In 2005 it had 236 students, filling 49% of the official capacity; this was the lowest percentage of any PGCPS school. At one point the capacity percentage was 38%. In 2010 it had 290 students, but after that year the student count declined: it had 216, and later 223 in the 2013–2014 school year, and the projected 2014-2015 enrollment was 187. In addition, in state tests circa 2014, about 56% of the students were proficient in reading while 36.7% were proficient in mathematics. In May 2014 PGCPS applied for a grant from the state of Maryland that would permit it to close Claggett.

References

Census-designated places in Prince George's County, Maryland
Census-designated places in Maryland